Crawling Wind is an EP by Univers Zero. It was a 3-song EP when originally released in 1983, but a 2001 reissue of the album included an extra studio track, "Influences" - originally issued on "The Recommended Records Sampler" 2-LP set - as well as two previously unreleased live tracks.

The track "Central Belgium in the Dark" is a live improvisation.

Track listing 

"Toujours Plus à l'Est" (Denis)  –  5:34
"Before the Heat" (Kirk)  –  4:06 
"Central Belgium in the Dark" (Denis, Descheemaeker, Kirk, Segers & Ward)  –  9:54
"Influences" (Kirk)  –  7:36 
"Triomphe des Mouches [Live]" (Denis)  –  9:55
"Complainte [Live]" (Denis)  -  5:29

Personnel 

Tracks 1-4:

• Daniel Denis: drums, percussion, voice, harmonium, violin, piano• Dirk Descheemaeker: clarinet, bass clarinet• Andy Kirk: harmonium, organ, voice, piano, synth, viola, music box, percussion, radio• Guy Segers: bass, voice, violin, "invisible talk", "flies talk"• Alan Ward: violin

Track 5:

• Daniel Denis: drums• Dirk Descheemaeker: clarinet, casto• Christian Genet: bass• André Mergenthaler: cello• Jean-Luc Plouvier: keyboards

Track 6:

• Michel Berckmans: oboe, bassoon• Daniel Denis: harmonium• Patrick Hanappier: viola• Guy Segers: percussion• Roger Trigaux: guitar

References 

Univers Zero albums
1983 EPs
Cuneiform Records EPs